The synod of Szabolcs was an assembly of the prelates of the Kingdom of Hungary which met at the fortress of Szabolcs on 21 May 1092. It was presided over by King Ladislaus I of Hungary. The synod passed decrees which regulated the life of both clergymen and laymen, several aspects of liturgy and Church administration and the relationships between Christians, Jews and Muslims.

References

Sources

 
 
 

History of Christianity in Hungary
1092 in Europe
11th-century church councils
11th century in Hungary